Peter Blake may refer to:

 Peter Blake (actor) (1948–2018), Scottish-born actor
 Peter Blake (artist) (born 1932), British pop artist
 Peter Blake (cricketer) (1927–2011), English cricketer
 Peter Blake (sailor) (1948–2001), New Zealand yachtsman
 Peter Blake (writer), co-executive producer of the television series House
 Peter Blake (Days of Our Lives), a character in the American soap opera Days of Our Lives
 Peter A. Blake (born 1957), American public administrator